Herzflimmern – Die Klinik am See is a German television series soap opera produced by Bavaria Film and broadcast on ZDF that aired from 2010 to 2012.

See also
List of German television series

External links
 

2010 German television series debuts
2012 German television series endings
German television soap operas
German-language television shows
ZDF original programming